Pericapritermes speciosus, is a species of small termite of the genus Pericapritermes. It is found in Sri Lanka and Borneo.

References

External links
Pericapritermes speciosus (Haviland, 1898)
The effect of remnant forest on insect successional response in tropical fire-impacted peatland: A bi-taxa comparison
The Impact of Tropical Peat Fire on Termite Assemblage in Sumatra, Indonesia: Reduced Complexity of Community Structure and Survival Strategies

Termites
Insects described in 1898